Erodium manescavi (or Erodium manescavii), called the garden stork's-bill, large purple storksbill, Manescau storksbill, Manescau heronsbill and showy heron's bill, is a species of flowering plant in the family Geraniaceae. It is native to the Pyrenees mountains of France, and has been introduced to Austria. As Erodium manescavii it has gained the Royal Horticultural Society's Award of Garden Merit.

References

manescavi
Garden plants of Europe
Endemic flora of France
Plants described in 1847